Ceratina picta, also known as Ceratina (Xanthoceratina) picta, is a species of bee belonging to the family Apidae subfamily Xylocopinae. It is endemic to Sri Lanka.

References

External links
 http://animaldiversity.org/accounts/Ceratina_beata/classification/
 https://www.academia.edu/7390502/AN_UPDATED_CHECKLIST_OF_BEES_OF_SRI_LANKA_WITH_NEW_RECORDS
 https://www.itis.gov/servlet/SingleRpt/RefRpt?search_type=author&search_id=author_id&search_id_value=93988
 http://beesind.com/beesind2/ceratina.htm

picta
Insects described in 1854